Trout Creek is a community and unincorporated area in the municipality of Powassan, Parry Sound District in Northern Ontario, Canada.

In was at "the Chalet" in Trout Creek that the first complete set of rules for the Canadian sport of ringette developed by Mirl Arthur "Red" McCarthy were presented to the Society of Directors of Municipal Recreation of Ontario (SDMRO) by the Northern Ontario Recreation Directors Association (NORDA) on May 31, 1965.

Etymology
It was called Melbourne after the pioneer settlers arrived in 1868, possibly for Melbourne, Australia, itself named in 1835 for Lord Melbourne (1779–1848), the British prime minister in 1834-41. However, its post office was called Barkerton in 1887. Three years later it was renamed Trout Creek.

Demographics 

Transportation
The Canadian National Railway transcontinental main line was the first transportation link that was constructed in the area during the late 19th century. In the early 20th century, the Ferguson Road, later becoming Ontario Highway 11 was constructed on a roughly parallel course to the rail line. Ontario Highway 11 was rerouted around the community in 2002 following its expansion to a four-lane divided highway, with Ontario Highway 522 assuming its former alignment south out of the community reaching its terminus at McFadden Line and Interchange 301, and the former northern alignment became Ontario Highway 522B reaching its terminus at Hemlock Road and Interchange 306.

Notable residents
Gerry Odrowski

James Corkery

References

Other map sources:

External links
 History of Trout Creek at the Municipality of Powassan web site

Former towns in Ontario
Communities in Parry Sound District
Designated places in Ontario